Kostas Arvanitis is a Greek politician currently serving as a Member of the European Parliament for the Coalition of the Radical Left.

References

Living people
MEPs for Greece 2019–2024
Syriza MEPs
Syriza politicians
Politicians from Athens
1964 births